The Government College for Women, Anantnag, is a college in Jammu and Kashmir (J&K) state under Indian governance. It was established in 1979 as an intermediate college in the heart of Anantnag town.

degrees

The college offers various undergraduate courses ranging from Arts, Science, to Humanities. Here is the list of Undergraduate Courses offered by the college.
 Bachelor of Commerce (BCOM)
 Bachelor of Computer Application (BCA)
 Bachelor of Science Medical (BSC)
 Bachelor of Science Non-Medical (BSC)
 Bachelor of Arts (BA)

Our Departments
Department Of Computer Science
Department Of Home Science
Department Of Botany
Department Of Zoology
Department Of Physics
Department Of Chemistry
Department Of Commerce 
Department Of Sericulture
Department Of Education
Department Of Economics
Department Of History
Department Of Political Science
Tour and Travel
Department Of Persian
Department Of Hindi
Department Of Urdu
Department Of Mathematics
Department Of English

References

Women's universities and colleges in Jammu and Kashmir
Educational institutions established in 1979
Anantnag
Degree colleges in Kashmir Division